Prentiss High School was a high school located in Prentiss, Mississippi, United States. It was a part of the Jefferson Davis County School District. It ceased operations at the end of the 2016–17 school year.

Notable alumni
 Al Jefferson, basketball player for the Indiana Pacers of the NBA; while at Prentiss High he earned the Mississippi Mr. Basketball award
 John A. Polk, member of Mississippi State Senate

References

External links

 Jefferson Davis County Schools

Public high schools in Mississippi
Schools in Jefferson Davis County, Mississippi
Public middle schools in Mississippi